Ayesha Khanna is an Indian bollywood film actress. She made her debut with Hindi film Dishkiyaoon. 

She started her career as a costume designer before being spotted by Sanamjit Singh Talwar, the director of Dishkyaoon who offered her the lead opposite Harman Baweja.

Filmography 
2014   Dishkiyaoon

References

External links
 
 

Indian film actresses
Actresses from New Delhi
Actresses in Hindi cinema
21st-century Indian actresses
Year of birth missing (living people)